Plicatula hunterae is an extinct species in the family Plicatulidae. It is present in the Tamiami Formation and Caloosahatchee Formation of south Florida.

It was alive during the late Pliocene and early Pleistocene ages.

References

Plicatulidae
Prehistoric bivalves of North America